Leptonota is a genus of longhorn beetles of the subfamily Lamiinae, containing the following species:

 Leptonota comitessa (White, 1855)
 Leptonota sepium Montrouzier, 1861

References

Enicodini